Ciudad Real railway station  (Spanish: Estación de Ciudad Real) is the main railway station of the Spanish city of Ciudad Real, Castilla–La Mancha. Located on the AVE high-speed rail line from Madrid Atocha to Seville-Santa Justa and Málaga María Zambrano, travel to Madrid can be achieved in under an hour.

History
The station was built in 1992 with the arrival of the AVE line, over the site of an older station which originally opened in 1880.
The arrival of the high-speed line to Ciudad Real has been credited with revitalising the city due to the short travel time to Madrid.

Services
Along with aforementioned AVE services to Madrid, Seville and Málaga; Alvia trains operate on from Madrid on the high-speed line and continuing on the classic Iberian gauge tracks to Cádiz, stopping at Ciudad Real. Altaria services operate between Madrid Atocha and Algeciras stopping at Ciudad Real, and Media Distancia trains to Alicante, Villena and Alcázar de San Juan.

References

Railway stations in Spain opened in 1992
Railway stations in Castilla–La Mancha
Buildings and structures in Ciudad Real